Sychrov is a municipality and village in Liberec District in the Liberec Region of the Czech Republic. It has about 200 inhabitants. It is known for the Sychrov Castle.

Administrative parts
Villages of Radostín, Sedlejovice, Třtí and Vrchovina are administrative parts of Sychrov.

Geography
It lies in the Jičín Uplands. The Mohelka River flows through the municipality.

History
The first written mention of Sychrov (under the name Svojkov) is from 1367. A fort was first documented in the 15th century. In the 17th century, the village disappeared and the fort was replaced by a small Baroque castle named Sychrov, which was built in 1690–1693. The newly established village got its name after the castle. The Sychrov Castle was reconstructed in the Empire style and expanded in 1834.

Sights

Sychrov is known for the Sychrov Castle. It gained its present appearance between 1847 and 1862, when it was rebuilt in the romantic neo-Gothic style. Today, the castle is open to the public and offers several sightseeing tours.

The castle complex includes a  large English-style park with an orangery. The park was gradually established between 1820 and 1855.

References

External links

Villages in Liberec District